Anupam Sarkar (born 26 April 1985) is an Indian professional footballer who plays as a defender for Mohammedan of the Calcutta Football League.

Club career
Anupam began his professional football career with East Bengal in 2004. He was also the captain of the West Bengal football team, that represents the state of West Bengal in the National Football Championship (Santosh Trophy). He won the 2010 edition with his team. He also played for East Bengal FC and Mohammedan Sporting.

In 2012, Sarkar signed with Prayag United, managed by Dutchman Eelco Schattorie. In I-League, they achieved a massive 10–1 victory over newly promoted United Sikkim. He won his first and only cup for the side on 20 March 2013 when Prayag United defeated East Bengal in the IFA Shield final 1–0 through a goal by Ranti Martins. The following season in the I-League, they thrashed Air India FC by 5–1 margin, and eventually finished the 2012–13 campaign leading Prayag United to a fourth-place finish with 44 points.

On 17 February 2015, Sarkar joined Georgian Erovnuli Liga 2 side FC Adeli Batumi on loan for four months.

Sarkar made his FC Adeli debut in a 6–0 win over FC STU Tbilisi on 21 March 2015. This appearance allowed Sarkar to join a select group of Indian footballers who have played abroad.

On 2 August 2016, it was announced that Sarkar would play for Mohammedan of the Calcutta Football League. Later on 1 October, he retired.

International career
Sarkar made his senior international debut for India at the 2007 AFC Asian Cup qualifying round in Group-A on 16 August 2006 against Saudi Arabia in their 3–0 defeat.

Honours
Prayag United
IFA Shield: 2013

See also
 List of Indian football players in foreign leagues

References

External links

Anupam Sarkar at Eurosport

1985 births
Living people
Indian footballers
Footballers from West Bengal
East Bengal Club players
Mohammedan SC (Kolkata) players
Mohun Bagan AC players
United SC players
I-League players
FC Pune City players
Indian Super League players
Indian expatriate footballers
Expatriate footballers in Georgia (country)
India youth international footballers
India international footballers
Association football fullbacks
Footballers at the 2006 Asian Games
Asian Games competitors for India